The Prince Michael International Road Safety Award is an annual award presented by Prince Michael of Kent since 1987 for outstanding achievement and innovation in improving road safety globally and is the top international road safety award.

History 
The award was originally created in 1987 to give public recognition to those improving road safety throughout Great Britain. The focus has since been expanded to assess road safety achievements, innovations, and improvements world-wide. Each December, Prince Michael has presented the award to honorees during a Gala Presentation at The Savoy in Westminster.

In 2017, the award celebrated 30 years. In recognizing the most outstanding achievements and innovations from all over the world in enhancing road safety for different road users, it has become internationally renowned as the top international road safety award.

Focus Areas 
The award bases its categories on the five pillars of the Global Plan for a Decade of Action for Road Safety (2011-2020) and focuses its selection on achievement and innovation in one of the following areas:

 Alcohol / drug-related
 Applied Technology
 Driver Education
 Education and Training
 Enforcement
 Fleet Safety
 Highway engineering improvement
 Media
 Motorcycle
 Occupational Road Safety
 Post Crash Response
 Public Education
 Road Safety Management
 Safer Road Users
 Safer Roads
 School Community-based
 Vehicle Safety
 Young Drivers

Each year His Royal Highness also presents a "Premier Award" to the organization which he considers has had the most impact on road safety.

Notable winners 

 Fédération Internationale de l'Automobile (FIA)
 Global Alliance of NGOs for Road Safety
 International Road Assessment Programme (iRAP)
 International Road Federation
 International Transport Forum
 LFR International
 MAPFRE
 New Car Assessment Program (Global NCAP)
 RAC Foundation
 SaveLIFE Foundation 
 The Floow Limited
 Transport for London (TfL)
Safe Way Right Way Uganda

References 

Awards established in 1987
British awards